Gustav Engel (24 July 1893 – 17 December 1989) was a German historian.

Life 
Born in Quakenbrück, Engel studied art history, English and French from 1912 to 1914. After the beginning of the First World War, Engel was called up before he could finish his studies. He was a prisoner of war until March 1920. Afterwards, Engel completed an apprenticeship in a bookshop to become an independent bookseller. From 1935, he was employed in the municipal archive in Bielefeld and studied in Münster with half his time of service. He finished his study in 1938 and received his doctorate with the thesis Geistiges Leben in Minden, Ravensberg und Herford während des 17. und 18. Jahrhunderts.

Since 1990, the association has awarded the Gustav Engel Prize annually in memory of his work.

Publications 
 Monographs
 Enger – Ein Heimatbuch zur Tausendjahrfeier (1948). Bertelsmann, Gütersloh 1948
 Stadt und Kreis Bielefeld (vol. 11). Regensberg, Münster 1950
 Die Stadtgründung im Bielefelde und das Münstersche Stadtrecht. Bielefeld, 1952
  Bielefeld zwischen gestern und morgen. Berlin / Holzminden 1954
 Spenderliste und Bautagebuch für den Bau des Bielefelder Gymnasiums im Jahre 1608: nach der Abschrift Reinhold Meyers. Küster, Bielefeld 1958
 Bielefeld: Bild einer Stadt. Impressionen und Profile. Edition Peters, Bad Honnef 1960, 
 Bielefelds Platz in der Geschichte der Städte Westfalens: Rede zur 750-Jahrfeier der Stadt Bielefeld.  1964
 Bielefeld: Gesicht und Wesen einer Stadt. Pfeffer, Bielefeld 1975
 Herrschaftsgeschichte und Standesrecht: Riege und Hagen, Hausgenossen, Hausgenossenschaften, Malmannen. Pfeffer, Bielefeld 1976
 Landesburg Und Landesherrschaft an Osning, Wiehen Und Weser: Mit Grundrissen, Ansichten Und Rekonstruktionen. Pfeffer, Bielefeld 1979, 
 Politische Geschichte Westfalens. 4th edition, Grote, 1980, 
 Die Westfalen: Volk, Geschichte, Kultur. Westfalen Verlag, 1987, 

 Essays
 Westfalen ist verschwunden. In Die Zeit, Nr. 22/1953

Further reading 
 Reinhard Vogelsang: Nachruf auf Prof. Engel. In Ravensberger Blätter, Heft 1, 1990

References

External links 
 
 Biographische Angaben auf den Seiten der Historischen Kommission für Westfalen

20th-century German historians
1893 births
1989 deaths
People from Quakenbrück